Forlorn Strangers are an American americana band from Nashville, Tennessee.

Career
Forlorn Strangers released their first EP, While The Grass Grows, in September 2013. In January 2015, the band released their second EP titled American Magic Tricks. In August 2016, the group released their self-titled debut album.

Band members
Chris Banke (vocals/guitar)
Abigail Dempsey (vocals/fiddle)
Hannah Leigh (vocals/mandolin)
Benjamin Lusk (vocals/banjo, guitar, piano)
Jesse Thompson (upright bass/dobro/pedal steel)

Discography
Studio albums
Forlorn Strangers (2016)
EPs
While The Grass Grows (2013)
American Magic Tricks (2015)

References

Musical groups from Nashville, Tennessee
Americana music groups